The CTIC Foundation (Center for the Development of Information and Communication Technologies in Asturias) is a non-profit private organization, constituted by a group of firms from the Information and Communication Technologies field, and the Government of the Principality of Asturias. The main goal of the CTIC Foundation is to promote and stimulate activities related to the development of Information and Communication Technologies in all fields of economic and social life in order to lead the impulse and strengthening of the Information Society. CTIC hosts the W3C Spanish Office.

See also 

 ONTORULE

External links 
 CTIC's official homepage
 W3C Spanish Office homepage
 TAW homepage

Information technology research institutes
Research institutes in Spain
Non-profit organisations based in Spain